Mike Stevens is a Canadian harmonica player from Bright's Grove, Ontario. He is best known as a bluegrass musician. During his career he has had hundreds of performances at the Grand Ole Opry.  He is also known for his work connecting creative artists with indigenous youth in isolated communities as part of the ArtsCan Circle.

Stevens' harmonica style was described by one reviewer as "multivoiced and blindingly fast".

Stevens entertained at the Central Canadian Bluegrass Awards festival in Huntsville, Ontario in 1998.

Stevens often performs with American fiddle and banjo player Raymond McLain. The duo entertained at the Palmer Rapids Twin Festival in July, 2003. They headlined a concert to raise money for the ArtsCan Circle in Toronto in 2004. They performed together at the Pineridge Bluegrass Folklore Society concert in February, 2008.

Discography
 Harmonica (1990) - Canadian Bluegrass Recording of the Year
 Life's Railway to Heaven (1994)
 Colin's Cross (1995)
 Normally Anomaly (1997)
 The World is Only Air... and a Very Dangerous Hat (2001)
 Blowin' Up a Storm (2002)
 Old Time Mojo (2005) with Raymond McClain
 Black Mustard (2005)
 Piggyback (2009) with Matt Andersen
 Push Record (2011) with Matt Andersen

References

External links

ArtsCan Circle
Facebook fan group

Musicians from Ontario
Canadian harmonica players
Living people
People from Sarnia
Year of birth missing (living people)